Dara, formerly Oğuz, is a village in the Artuklu District of Mardin Province in Turkey. The village is populated by Kurds and had a population of 1,029 in 2021.

History 
The village was populated by Catholic Armenians until the Armenian genocide in 1915. Kurds from Bayraklı, Derik would subsequently settle in the village and have since then been intertwined with the surrounding Dakoran tribe.

See also 

 Battle of Dara (530 CE)
 Dara (Mesopotamia)
 Dara Dam – Roman arch dam

References 

Villages in Artuklu District
Kurdish settlements in Mardin Province